Erer is a zone of Somali Region in Ethiopia.

See also 

 List of zones of Ethiopia

References 

Zones of Ethiopia
Somali Region